JFX may refer to:
 JavaFX, a software platform
 Jones Falls Expressway, a freeway in Baltimore, Maryland
 Walker County Airport, in Alabama, United States